Coccothrinax orientalis is a palm which is endemic to eastern Cuba.

Henderson and colleagues (1995) considered C. orientalis to be a synonym of Coccothrinax miraguama.

References

orientalis
Trees of Cuba
Plants described in 1939